The Na Hang Dam (also known as Tuyên Quang Dam) is a hydroelectric dam on the Gâm River near Pác Tạ Mountain in Tuyên Quang Province, Vietnam.

Construction began on December 22, 2002, and the first unit was commissioned in March 2008 followed by the two other units by end of 2008. The power plant has a capacity of 342 MW (the second largest in the north), and has an energy generating potential of 1,200 GWh per year. The project's estimated approved cost was US$490 million.

Construction of the dam inundated five communes involving about 4,000 households from an area of almost 8,000 hectares. Tay and Dao indigenous peoples were the majority in the Na Hang 
district when the dam was constructed. There are human rights concerns about missing compensation for relocation, with claims that infrastructure to support resettlement sites as agreed has been neglected by provincial authorities.

The local government has tried to take advantage of the Na Hang District hydroelectric project for tourism.

References

External links

Son La Dam - Vietnam National Committee on Large Dams

Hydroelectric power stations in Vietnam
Dams in Vietnam
Buildings and structures in Tuyên Quang province
Dams completed in 2008
Energy infrastructure completed in 2008
Rock-filled dams